The 2012 Guizhou Renhe season is Guizhou Renhe's 11th consecutive season in the top division of Chinese football. They also competed in the Chinese FA Cup that year, making it to the final of that competition.

Players

First team squad
As of 30 October 2012

Reserve squad

On loan

Transfers

Winter

In:

Out:

Summer

In:

Out:

Competitions

Chinese Super League

League table

Matches

Chinese FA Cup

References

Beijing Renhe F.C. seasons
Guizhou Renhe F.C.